The 1958 Pontypool by-election was held on 10 November 1958 after the incumbent Labour MP, Granville West was elevated to a life peerage.  The seat was retained by the Labour candidate Leo Abse.

Result

References

By-elections to the Parliament of the United Kingdom in Welsh constituencies
Pontypool by-election
1950s elections in Wales
Elections in Monmouthshire
Pontypool by-election
Pontypool by-election
20th century in Monmouthshire